The United Nations Educational, Scientific and Cultural Organization (UNESCO) World Heritage Sites are places of importance to cultural or natural heritage as described in the UNESCO World Heritage Convention, established in 1972. Colombia accepted the convention on 24 May 1983, making its historical sites eligible for inclusion on the list. As of 2018, there are nine World Heritage Sites in Colombia, including six cultural sites, two natural sites and one mixed site.

The first site in Colombia, Port, Fortresses and Group of Monuments, Cartagena, was inscribed on the list at the 8th Session of the World Heritage Committee, held in Buenos Aires, Argentina in 1984. Los Katíos National Park was inscribed as the first natural site in 1994. Chiribiquete National Park – "The Maloca of the Jaguar" was added to the list in 2018 as Colombia's latest inscription.

World Heritage Sites 

Site; named after the World Heritage Committee's official designation
Location; at city, regional, or provincial level and geocoordinates
Criteria; as defined by the World Heritage Committee
Area; in hectares and acres. If available, the size of the buffer zone has been noted as well. A value of zero implies that no data has been published by UNESCO
Year; during which the site was inscribed to the World Heritage List
Description; brief information about the site, including reasons for qualifying as an endangered site, if applicable

Tentative list
In addition to sites inscribed on the World Heritage list, member states can maintain a list of tentative sites that they may consider for nomination. Nominations for the World Heritage list are only accepted if the site was previously listed on the tentative list. As of 2016, Colombia lists eighteen properties on its tentative list:

 Canal del Dique, External link (Submitted 27/09/2012)
 Catholic Doctrine Temples (Submitted 27/09/2012)
 Cultural Landscape of Salt Towns (Submitted 27/09/2012)
 Cultural Landscape of the Lower Basin of the Chicamocha River (Submitted 27/09/2012)
 Ciénaga Grande de Santa Marta - Cultural Landscape of the Vernacular Stilt Housing of Cienaga Grande de Santa Marta and of Medio Atrato (Submitted 22/10/2013)
 Pre-Hispanic Hydraulic System of the San Jorge River (Submitted 27/09/2012)
 Puente de Occidente (Western Bridge) (Submitted 27/09/2012)
 Seaflower Marine Protected Area (MPA) (Submitted 18/09/2007)
 Sistema Hidráulico Prehispánico del Río San Jorge (Submitted 29/10/1993)
 South of Ricaurte Province (Submitted 27/09/2012)
 Tatacoa Desert (Submitted 27/09/2012)
 Tayrona and Sierra Nevada de Santa Marta National Parks and their Archaeological Sites (Submitted 27/09/2012)
 United Fruit Company Infrastructure (Submitted 27/09/2012)
 University City of Bogotá (Submitted 27/09/2012)
 Virgilio Barco Library (Submitted 27/09/2012)
 The architectural legacy of Rogelio Salmona: an ethical, political, social and poetic manifesto (Submitted 01/02/2022)

References

 
Colombia
World Heritage Sites
World Heritage Sites